Clostera inornata is a species of moth in the family Notodontidae (the prominents). It was first described by Berthold Neumoegen in 1882 and it is found in North America.

The MONA or Hodges number for Clostera inornata is 7897.

References

Further reading

 
 
 

Notodontidae
Articles created by Qbugbot
Moths described in 1882